Banshee is a cross-platform open-source media player, called Sonance until 2005. Built upon Mono and Gtk#, it used the GStreamer multimedia platform for encoding, and decoding various media formats, including Ogg Vorbis, MP3 and FLAC. Banshee can play and import audio CDs and supports many portable media players, including Apple's iPod, Android devices and Creative's ZEN players. Other features include Last.fm integration, album artwork fetching, smart playlists and podcast support. Banshee is released under the terms of the MIT License. Stable versions are available for many Linux distributions, as well as a beta preview for OS X and an alpha preview for Windows.

Banshee was the default music player for a year in Ubuntu and for some time in Linux Mint, but was later replaced by Rhythmbox in both distributions.

Banshee uses the SQLite database library.

Plugins
Banshee's plugin-capable architecture makes the software extensible and customizable.  stable plugins include:
Audioscrobbler: Adds the capability of reporting played songs to a user's Last.fm playlist, and play last.fm radio stations (user's library, tags, similar to, etc.).
DAAP music sharing: Allows sharing of music libraries with iTunes and other DAAP-compatible music software. The current version of Banshee is only partially compatible with iTunes 7, allowing iTunes to open a Banshee library, but not vice versa.
iPod manager: Allows the transferring of songs, videos, and album art to and from the device.
Metadata searcher using MusicBrainz: Automatically retrieves missing and supplementary metadata for library items, including album art.
Music Recommendations using Last.fm: Recommends music based on the currently playing song.
Mini-Mode plugin: Provides a small window with minimal playback controls and song information.
Multimedia keys support in GNOME: Banshee can be controlled via multimedia keys as configured through GNOME.
Notification Area Icon: Adds an icon to the notification area in GNOME.
Podcasting: Enables Banshee to subscribe to podcast feeds, which are updated on a regular basis.
Radio: Provides support for streaming Internet radio stations.

Cross-platform support
Compared to the Linux builds, which have stable releases, the Mac OS X builds are considered beta quality, and Windows builds are alpha quality (and, as of April 2013, two versions behind the other platforms). During Google Summer of Code 2012 Banshee has seen substantial improvements to its OS X support

The first alpha release of Banshee on Windows was Banshee 1.9.4, released on February 23, 2011.

Release history

Helix Banshee
Helix Banshee was a version of Banshee, included in older versions of SUSE Linux Enterprise Desktop and openSUSE. It was based upon the Banshee core, but with a plug-in to add support for the Helix framework for playback and transcoding, in addition to GStreamer.

See also

Software audio players (free and open-source)

References

2005 software
Applications using D-Bus
Audio player software that uses GTK
Free audio software
Free media players
Free software programmed in C Sharp
IPod software
Jukebox-style media players
Linux media players
MacOS multimedia software
Software that uses GStreamer
Software that uses Mono (software)
Software using the MIT license
Windows multimedia software